Manuel Torres may refer to:

Government and politics
 Manuel Torres (diplomat) (1762–1822), first Colombian ambassador to the United States
 Manuel Montt (1809–1880), Torres, president of Chile between 1851 and 1861
 Manuel A. Torres (born 1965), Puerto Rican politician

Sports
Manuel Torres (equestrian) (born 1957), Colombian Olympic equestrian
Manuel Torres (footballer, born 1930) (1930–2014), Spanish footballer
Manuel Torres (footballer, born 1978) (born 1978), Panamanian footballer
Manuel Torres (footballer, born 1991), Spanish footballer
Juan Manuel Torres (born 1985), Argentine footballer

Others
 Manuel Torre or Manuel Torres (1878–1933), flamenco singer
 Manuel Torres Félix (1958–2012), Mexican criminal
 Constantino Manuel Torres, archaeologist
 Manuel R. Torres, Spanish researcher